Axel "Axe" Hilgenstöhler (born August 1975) is a German Record Producer, Mixing Engineer and Guitarist. He is a founding member of the band Thumb and played guitar with many Bands, e.g. Dog Eat Dog and 50 Cent. In 2003 Afrika Islam founded with Hilgenstöhler the group The Machine.

Biography 
Axe received musical education in his childhood. In 1993 he founded together with Steffen Wilmking (later Member of H-Blockx ) the band Thumb.

In 2007 Axe started to play the guitar for Dog Eat Dog.

Recently Axe is working in many different areas of music production, like musical direction (Das Wunder von Bern), audio engineering and live mixing (Simply Red Farewell Tour) or incubator (Artisto – Revolution – The Anthem at Maidan Nezalezhnosti.)
He also is the Chairman of the executive board of the United World Organisation.

Axe has worked with musicians and producers like Afrika Bambaataa, Flea ( Red Hot Chili Peppers ), Mastermind ( Public Enemy ), Chuck D, Kool Keith, D-Rock ( Body Count Doug Wimbish, Vernon Reed ( Living Colour ) and Ice-T.

References

External links 
AxeTrax Facebook Page Official Site
Axel Hilgenstöhler at Discogs
Axe Interview – Mr. X and Machine

1975 births
Living people
German guitarists
German male guitarists
21st-century guitarists
21st-century German male musicians